Reserve Officers' Training Corps in South Korea is a college-based officer training program  which was established in 1961. South Korea's Conscription Law applies to males, aged between 18 and 35, although women are allowed to enroll in the ROTC as of 2010.

Applicants to the ROTC program go through a screening process; a written exam, an interview and health examination, and a background check. Once accepted, members undergo physical and military education throughout the semester; they are also required to undergo actual military training during school holidays. After commissioning, they serve for two and a half years; an individual may choose to extend his or her service past the required period in pursuit of an active military career.

Impact on South Korean society
It was estimated by a Library of Congress research in 1990 that approximately 40% of new second lieutenants were commissioned from the ROTC program after two years of training and two years and three months of obligatory service; most would leave the service after the obligatory period. The Korea Army Academy at Yeongcheon produced another 40% of new second lieutenants; 5% were graduates of various military academies and 15% were directly commissioned specialists in the medical corps, judge advocates and chaplains. It has been postulated that the ROTC program in South Korea has contributed to national integration and cultural homogeneity, where military training had become a common cultural and organizational reference point; military officers became business managers and military conscripts became factory workers. A case in point would be Hyundai, which systematically preferred workers who had undergone ROTC training.

In 2011, South Korea had 9,063 ROTC cadets from 109 universities.

Evaluation 
Until the establishment of ROTC, the military training program lacked consistency in its implementation plans, the lack of operational constraints and administrative support of senior officers, and the purpose of receiving indifference and military training by students with a higher degree of service and expense. However, the establishment of a ROTC was able to solve all problems, efficiently carry out the training procedures of junior officers, and smoothly fill up the junior officers.

Ties with United States ROTC
Cadets of the United States Reserve Officers' Training Corps routinely collaborate with their South Korean counterparts in cultural exchanges such as the Cultural Understanding and Language Proficiency (CULP) program.

See also
Reserve Officers' Training Corps
Reserve Officers' Training Corps (Philippines)
Reserve Officers' Training Corps (Taiwan)
Army Cadet military school

References

Military education and training in South Korea